Lithopsyche is a fossil butterfly known from Oligocene-aged strata of the Isle of Wight, England. The sole specimen is too incomplete to allow a certain assignment of a family, but it was placed on its description as a geometrid and more recently in the Riodininae.

The late Eocene-aged Lithodryas styx, of Colorado, was originally described with the same genus name.

References 

Fossil Lepidoptera
†
Fossil taxa described in 1889
Oligocene insects
Prehistoric insects of Europe